This is a list of countries by Internet connection speed for average and median data transfer rates for Internet access by end-users.
The difference between average and median speeds is the way individual measurements are aggregated. Average speeds are more commonly used but can give a wrong impression of the actual user experience since fast connections can bias the average results. Median results represent the point where half the population has faster and the other half of the population has slower data transfer rates.

Fixed broadband 
This is a sortable list of broadband internet connection speed by country, ranked by Speedtest.net data for April 2021, and with M-Lab data for May 2020 and SpeedTestNet.io data for March 2021, and BandwidthPlace.com data for April 2022., and Speed Test Pros data for February 2023.

Mobile connection

See also 
 List of countries by number of Internet users
 Government Broadband Index

References

External links 
 akamai's [state of the internet] - Q4 2015 report
 akamai's [state of the internet] - Q3 2015 report

Internet Connection Speeds

Internet-related lists
IT infrastructure